Translator is the self-titled third album from Translator, released in 1985 on 415 Records and distributed by Columbia Records.

In 2007, the album was released on Compact Disc for the first time by Wounded Bird Records. The CD release included two songs from a single as bonus tracks.

Track listing
"Gravity"
"Fall Forever"
"Come With Me"
"Friends Of The Future"
"New Song"
"Another American Night"
"O Lazarus"
"Inside My Mind"
"Heaven By A String"
"Breathless Agony"	

2007 CD bonus tracks
"Come With Me" (single version)
"Dizzy, Miss Lizzy" (b-side)

References

1985 albums
Translator (band) albums
Albums produced by Ed Stasium
415 Records albums